The 1961 Cincinnati Reds season was a season in American baseball. It consisted of the Reds winning the National League pennant with a 93–61 record, four games ahead of the runner-up Los Angeles Dodgers, but losing the World Series in five games to the New York Yankees. The Reds were managed by Fred Hutchinson, and played their home games at Crosley Field. The Reds were also the last team to win the National League in the 154-game schedule era, before going to a 162-game schedule a year later.

Cincinnati's road to the World Series was truly a remarkable one, as the Reds went through significant changes in a single season to improve from a team that won just 67 games and finished 28 games behind the eventual World Series Champion Pittsburgh Pirates in 1960. The architect of the turnaround was the Reds' new general manager Bill DeWitt, who left his role as president and general manager of the Detroit Tigers after the end of the 1960 season to replace Gabe Paul as the Reds' GM. Paul was hired as the general manager of the expansion Houston Colt .45s.

DeWitt, who had a short history of successful trades in Detroit including acquiring Norm Cash and Rocky Colavito, went to work at the 1960 Winter Meetings for Cincinnati. DeWitt found trade partners in the Milwaukee Braves and the Chicago White Sox. In essentially a three-team trade, the Reds acquired pitchers Joey Jay and Juan Pizarro for slick-fielding shortstop Roy McMillan on Dec. 15, 1960. On that same day, the Reds then traded Pizzaro and pitcher Cal McLish to the White Sox for third baseman Gene Freese. It was the fourth time Freese had been traded in 18 months. Most recently, the White Sox had acquired Freese from the Philadelphia Phillies for future all star Johnny Callison in December 1959.

Reds owner Powel Crosley, Jr. died suddenly of a heart attack at his home in Cincinnati on March 28, 1961, 13 days before the start of the Reds' season. DeWitt would eventually purchase 100% of the team ownership from Crosley's estate by year's end.

The Reds began the season with Freese at third base, sure-handed Eddie Kasko moved from third (where he played in 1960) to shortstop and long-time minor leaguer Jim Baumer at second base. Baumer was one of MLB's "feel good" stories. After playing in nine games with the White Sox in 1949 as an 18 year old rookie, Baumer returned to the minor leagues and didn't make it back to the big league for 11 years. The Reds drafted Baumer during the Rule 5 draft after the Pittsburgh Pirates left him unprotected. After a solid spring training with the Reds, Baumer was named starting second baseman to open the season. As the season began, expectations were low for the Reds among baseball "experts." The Reds won their first three games, but then went into a slump, losing 10 of 12. To the surprise of many, it was the Reds' offense that struggled most. Baumer in particular was hitting just .125. DeWitt then made a bold move on April 27, 1961, trading all-star catcher Ed Bailey to the San Francisco Giants for second baseman Don Blasingame, catcher Bob Schmidt and journeyman pitcher Sherman Jones. Blasingame was inserted as starter at second base, and Baumer was traded to the Detroit Tigers on May 10 for backup first baseman Dick Gernert. Baumer never again played in the majors.

On April 30, the Reds won the second game of a double-header from the Pittsburgh Pirates to begin a 9-game winning streak. Exactly a month after the trade of Bailey, the Reds began another win streak, this time six games, to improve to 26–16. Those streaks were part of a stretch where the Reds won 50 of 70 games to improve to 55–30. Cincinnati led Los Angeles by five games at the All Star break.

After the break, the Dodgers got hot and the Reds floundered. After the games of August 13, Los Angeles was 69-40 and led Cincinnati (70-46) by 2½ games, but six in the loss column as the Dodgers had played seven fewer games than the Reds due to multiple rainouts. On August 15, the Reds went into Los Angeles to begin a three-game, two-day series highlighted by a double-header. In the first game of the series, Reds' righty Joey Jay bested Sandy Koufax and the Dodgers, 5–2, as Eddie Kasko had four hits and Frank Robinson drove in two for Cincinnati. In the Wednesday double-header, knuckle-baller Bob Purkey threw a four-hit shutout as the Reds won Game 1, 6–0. In Game 2, Freese hit two home runs off Dodgers' lefty Johnny Podres and Jim O'Toole hurled a two-hitter as the Reds completed the sweep with an 8–0 victory. The Reds left Los Angeles with a half-game lead. It was the Dodgers' fourth-straight loss in what would turn out to be a 10-game losing streak to put the Dodgers in a hole, while the Reds stayed in first-place the rest of the season.

The Reds clinched their first pennant in 21 years on Sept. 26 when they beat the Cubs, 6–3, in the afternoon and the Dodgers lost to the Pittsburgh Pirates, 8–0, in the second game of a doubleheader. The Reds earned a chance to face the mighty New York Yankees in the 1961 World Series.

Outfielders Frank Robinson and Vada Pinson led the Reds offense while starting pitchers Bob Purkey, Jim O'Toole and newcomer Joey Jay were the staff standouts. Robinson (37 homers, 124 RBI, 117 runs scored, 22 stolen bases, .323 average) was named National League MVP. Pinson (208 hits, .343 average, 101 runs scored, 23 stolen bases) and a Gold Glove recipient, finished third in MVP voting. Purkey won 16 games, O'Toole won 19 and Jay won an NL-best 21 games. Jay also finished a surprising fifth in NL MVP voting, one spot ahead of future Hall of Famer Willie Mays who hit 40 home runs and drove in 123 for the Giants, such was the respect the Baseball Writers had for Jay's contributions to the Reds' pennant.

At a position (3B) that the Reds had received little offensive production from in the recent years leading up to 1961, Freese provided a major boost, slugging 26 home runs and driving in 87 runs to go with a .277 average.

Hutchinson, a former MLB pitcher, was masterful in his handling of the pitching staff as well as juggling a lineup that included part-timers (and former slugging standouts) Gus Bell, Wally Post (20, 57, .294) as well as Jerry Lynch (13, 50, .315). For the second straight season, Lynch led the National League with 19 pinch hits. Hutchinson was named Manager of the Year.

Player Moves
 December 3, 1960: Second baseman Billy Martin was sold to the Milwaukee Braves.
 December 14, 1960: Catcher Joe Azcue was sold to the Milwaukee Braves.
 December 15, 1960: Pitchers Joey Jay and Juan Pizarro were acquired from the Milwaukee Braves in a trade for shortstop Roy McMillan.
 December 15, 1960: Third baseman Gene Freese was acquired from the Chicago White Sox in a trade for pitchers Juan Pizarro and Cal McLish.
 January 21, 1961: Pitchers John Tsitouris and Johnny Briggs were acquired from the Kansas City Athletics in a trade for pitcher Joe Nuxhall.
 February 24, 1961: Catcher Frank House was sold to the Baltimore Orioles.
 April 27, 1961: Second baseman Don Blasingame, catcher Bob Schmidt and pitcher Sherman Jones were acquired in a trade with the San Francisco Giants for catcher Ed Bailey.
 May 10, 1961: First baseman Dick Gernert was acquired from the Detroit Tigers in a trade for infielder Jim Baumer.
 July 21, 1961: Pitcher Ken Johnson was acquired from the Kansas City Athletics for cash.
 September 16, 1961: Pitcher Dave Sisler and cash were acquired from the Washington Senators for pitcher Claude Osteen.

Season standings

Record vs. opponents

Roster

Player stats

Batting

Starters by position
Note: Pos = Position; G = Games played; AB = At bats; H = Hits; Avg. = Batting average; HR = Home runs; RBI = Runs batted in

Other batters
Note: Pos = Position; G = Games played; AB = At bats; H = Hits; Avg. = Batting average; HR = Home runs; RBI = Runs batted in

Pitching

Starting pitchers
Note: G = Games pitched; CG = Complete games; IP = Innings pitched; W = Wins; L = Losses; ERA = Earned run average; SO = Strikeouts

Other pitchers
Note: G = Games pitched; CG = Complete games; IP = Innings pitched; W = Wins; SV = Saves; ERA = Earned run average; SO = Strikeouts

Relief pitchers
Note: G = Games pitched; IP = Innings pitched; W = Wins; L = Losses; SV = Saves; ERA = Earned run average; SO = Strikeouts

1961 World Series

Awards and honors
 Fred Hutchinson, Associated Press NL Manager of the Year
 Frank Robinson, National League Most Valuable Player
 Vada Pinson, Outfield, National League Gold Glove

Farm system

LEAGUE CHAMPIONS: Topeka, Tampa

References

External links
1961 Cincinnati Reds season at Baseball Reference
1961 Cincinnati Reds season at Baseball Almanac

Cincinnati Reds seasons
Cincinnati Reds season
National League champion seasons
Cincinnati Reds